Kalhaar Blues & Greens Golf Club is a golf course located in the city of Ahmadabad in the Indian state of Gujarat.

History 
The golf course was designed by Jack Nicklaus's company Nicklaus Design. Construction began in 2012. It is one of India's most famous golf courses and was rated as India's Best Golf Course of 2015 by World Golf Awards and India Golf Awards.

Design 
The golf course is spread over 175 acres and plays up to 7,425 yards from the championship tees, making it India's longest golf course. The club was developed by the Navratna Group, Ahmedabad. It was designed to comply with United States Golf Association (USGA) specifications. The golf course layout has unique challenges and aesthetics including sand, beach bunkers and 14 water bodies covering over 35 acres.

The course has a scenic island green on the seventh hole 7 (174 yards, par 3) that covers over 35 acres. In addition to this, the seventh has a slope rating of 76.8 and 142 meaning that a scratch golfer can play 4.8 over the course (76.8-72) from the back tees.

In April 2015, the club hosted the PGTI Ahmedabad Masters 2015, the first tournament of the super series launched by PGTI on the lines of the USPGA’s FedEx Cup and European tours race to Dubai.

References

Golf clubs and courses in India
2012 establishments in Gujarat
Sports venues completed in 2012
Sports venues in Ahmedabad